The West Jersey Football League is a 94-school superconference that stretches from Princeton, New Jersey to Wildwood, New Jersey encompassing schools from the Colonial Valley Conference, the Burlington County Scholastic League, the Olympic Conference (New Jersey), the Tri-County Conference (New Jersey), the Colonial Conference (New Jersey), and the Cape-Atlantic League. The WJFL is made up of 17 divisions: (American, Capitol, Classic, Colonial, Constitution, Continental, Diamond, Freedom, Horizon, Independence, Liberty, Memorial, National, Patriot, Royal, United, and Valley) with divisional alignments based on school size, geography, and a strength-of-program component. The league operates under the auspices of the Leagues and Conferences Committee of the New Jersey State Interscholastic Athletic Association.

History
The league comprises 94 teams from public and private high schools in South Jersey and is the second-largest high school football league in New Jersey. The league was created in 2010 as a better way to balance teams that had faced imbalances in the size and quality of teams within conferences. While some regretted the loss of old rivalries, the conference made an effort to establish crossover games between teams that had traditions under which they had played each other regularly in the past.

With a decline in the number of student athletes playing football at West Windsor-Plainsboro High School North that would be inadequate for the school to field a team of its own, the West Windsor-Plainsboro Regional School District attempted to combine the teams from the two schools to have them operate as a single co-operative football team for the 2017-18 school year based at West Windsor-Plainsboro High School South. Given that the size of the schools is larger than the threshold established by the state for co-op programs (North is classified as Group 3 and South as Group 4 based on the size of the enrollment of each school), the proposal was rejected in a 76-16 vote by the West Jersey Football League and by the Leagues and Conferences Committee of the New Jersey State Interscholastic Athletic Association, before an appeal of the decision was rejected by the Commissioner of the New Jersey Department of Education. In August 2017, the district announced that WW-P North would cancel its program. The members of the canceled program will be eligible to play for the North junior varsity football team, but will not be able to play for the South team.

Divisions

Here is the 2022-23 West Jersey Football League divisional alignment. The new divisions were announced by the WJFL on February 4, 2022. Division alignments change every two years depending on school size. The schools are organized into their 2022-24 NJSIAA group classification. The Horizon Division was added in 2022.

American Division
Cherokee High School (New Jersey) (South, Group 5)
Lenape High School (South, Group 5)
Millville Senior High School (South, Group 4)
Shawnee High School (New Jersey) (South, Group 4)
St. Augustine Preparatory School (Non-Public, Group A)
Williamstown High School (New Jersey) (South, Group 5,)

Capitol Division
Ewing High School (New Jersey) (South, Group 3)
Hamilton High School West (South, Group 4)
Hopewell Valley Central High School (South, Group 3)
Notre Dame High School (New Jersey) (Non-Public, Group A)
Nottingham High School (New Jersey) (South, Group 3)
Trenton Central High School (South, Group 5)

Classic Division
Cherry Hill High School East (South, Group 5)
Florence Memorial High School (South, Group 1)
Haddon Township High School (South, Group 1)
Holy Cross Preparatory Academy (Non-Public, Group B)
Palmyra High School (New Jersey) (South, Group 1)
Princeton High School (New Jersey) (South, Group 4)

Colonial Division
Audubon High School (New Jersey) (South, Group 1)
Collingswood High School (South, Group 2)
Deptford Township High School (South, Group 3)
Gloucester City Junior-Senior High School (South, Group 2)
Overbrook High School (New Jersey) (South, Group 2)

Constitution Division
Camden High School (New Jersey) (South, Group 3)
Camden Catholic High School (Non-Public, Group A)
Haddonfield Memorial High School (South, Group 2)
Haddon Heights Junior/Senior High School  (South, Group 2)
Sterling High School (New Jersey) (South, Group 2)
West Deptford High School (South, Group 2)

Continental Division
Clearview Regional High School (South, Group 4)
Holy Spirit High School (New Jersey) (Non-Public, Group B)
Kingsway Regional High School (South, Group 5)
Vineland High School (South, Group 5)
Washington Township High School (New Jersey) (South, Group 5)

Diamond Division
Paulsboro High School (South, Group 1)
Penns Grove High School (South, Group 1)
Salem High School (New Jersey) (South, Group 1)
Woodbury Junior-Senior High School (South, Group 1)
Woodstown High School (South, Group 1)

Freedom Division
Bordentown Regional High School (South, Group 2)
Burlington City High School (South, Group 1)
Cinnaminson High School  (South, Group 2)
Maple Shade High School (South, Group 1)
New Egypt High School (South, Group 1)
Pemberton Township High School (South, Group 3)

Horizon Division 
Eustace Preparatory School (Non-Public Group B)
Gloucester Catholic High School (Non-Public Group B)
Lindenwold High School (South, Group 2)
Riverside High School (New Jersey) (South, Group 1)
Arthur P. Schalick High School (South, Group 1)
Wildwood High School (South, Group 1)

Independence Division
Cedar Creek High School (New Jersey) (South, Group 3)
Delsea Regional High School (South, Group 3)
Ocean City High School (South, Group 4)
St. Joseph Academy (New Jersey) (Non-Public Group B)
Winslow Township High School (South, Group 4)

Liberty Division
Burlington Township High School (South, Group 3)
Delran High School (South, Group 2)
Pennsauken High School (South, Group 4)
Willingboro High School (South, Group 2)
Woodrow Wilson High School (New Jersey) (South, Group 3)

Memorial Division
Eastern Regional High School (South, Group 5)
Hammonton High School (South, Group 4)
Highland Regional High School (South, Group 3)
Rancocas Valley Regional High School (South, Group 5)
Timber Creek Regional High School (South, Group 3)

National Division
Cherry Hill High School West (South, Group 4)
Moorestown High School (South, Group 4)
Northern Burlington County Regional High School (South, Group 4)
Paul VI High School (Non-Public, Group A)
Seneca High School (New Jersey) (South, Group 3)
Triton Regional High School (New Jersey) (South, Group 3)

Patriot Division
Buena Regional High School (South, Group 1)
Clayton High School (New Jersey) (South, Group 1)
Glassboro High School (South, Group 1)
Middle Township High School (South, Group 2)
Pleasantville High School (New Jersey) (South, Group 2)

Royal Division
Cumberland Regional High School (South, Group 3)
Gateway Regional High School (New Jersey) (South, Group 1)
Lower Cape May Regional High School (South, Group 2)
Pennsville Memorial High School (South, Group 1)
Pitman High School (South, Group 1)

United Division
Absegami High School (South, Group 4)
Atlantic City High School (South, Group 5)
Bridgeton High School (South, Group 5)
Egg Harbor Township High School (South, Group 5)
Mainland Regional High School (New Jersey) (South, Group 4)
Oakcrest High School (South, Group 2)

Valley Division
Allentown High School (South, Group 3)
Hightstown High School (South, Group 4)
Lawrence High School (New Jersey) (South, Group 3)
Robbinsville High School (New Jersey) (South, Group 3)
Steinert High School (South, Group 4)
West Windsor-Plainsboro High School South (Co-op program with West Windsor-Plainsboro High School North) (South, Group 5)

References

External links 

NJSIAA

2010 establishments in New Jersey
New Jersey high school athletic conferences